Cardiff Rose is a solo studio album by American singer/songwriter and ex-The Byrds frontman Roger McGuinn, released in 1976. The album, produced by Mick Ronson, was recorded on the heels of Bob Dylan's Rolling Thunder Revue 1975 tour, in which both McGuinn and Ronson had participated. The album includes a pirate tale "Jolly Roger", a song about King Arthur's "Round Table", and a classic version of Joni Mitchell's "Dreamland", which later appeared on her 1977 album Don Juan's Reckless Daughter.

Stylistically, the album varies from traditional sounding folk and sea chanty music (such as the aforementioned "Jolly Roger") to hard, gritty rock tunes strongly influenced by the burgeoning punk rock movement (such as "Rock and Roll Time").

Track listing
All titles are written by Roger McGuinn and Jacques Levy except where otherwise noted.

Side one
 "Take Me Away" – 3:00
 "Jolly Roger" – 4:56
 "Rock and Roll Time" (McGuinn, Kris Kristofferson, Bobby Neuwirth) – 2:46
 "Friend" (McGuinn) – 2:07
 "Partners in Crime" – 4:52

Side two
 "Up to Me" (Bob Dylan) – 5:36
 "Round Table" – 4:05
 "Pretty Polly" (Traditional, arranged and adapted by McGuinn) – 3:17
 "Dreamland" (Joni Mitchell) – 5:20

Bonus tracks on CD reissue
 "Soul Love" (demo recording)
 "Dreamland" (live)

Personnel
Roger McGuinn – acoustic guitar, electric guitar, vocals
Mick Ronson – acoustic guitar, electric guitar, recorder, accordion, piano, organ, autoharp, percussion, vocals
David Mansfield – acoustic guitar, electric guitar, steel guitar, mandolin, violin, banjo, organ, percussion
Rob Stoner – bass, percussion, vocals
Howie Wyeth – drums, percussion
Timothy B. Schmit – vocals
Kim Hutchcroft – saxophone

References

Roger McGuinn albums
1976 albums
Albums produced by Mick Ronson
Columbia Records albums